The Tararua Wind Farm is a wind farm owned and operated by Mercury NZ Ltd. It is located on 700ha of farmland on the Tararua Ranges of New Zealand. It has become New Zealand's largest capacity wind farm, with a total capacity of 161MW.

The wind farm was first commissioned in 1999 and has been upgraded twice since. The most recent addition was commissioned in September 2007.

The wind farm consists of 134 turbines of two different types:
103 Vestas V47 turbines, each rated at 660 kW, with three 23.5m long blades. Each turbine is mounted on a 40m high steel lattice tower.
31 Vestas V90-3MW turbines, each rated at 3 MW with three 45m long blades.
The V47 turbines connect into Powerco's Palmerston North distribution network via twin 33,000-volt lines. The V90 turbines connect into Transpower's national grid via a tee off one circuit of the Bunnythorpe to Linton 220,000-volt transmission line.

On 6 October 2021, one of the V90 turbines caught fire. Five turbines in the same cluster were taken out of service due to the fire.

See also

Te Apiti Wind Farm
Te Rere Hau Wind Farm
Wind farm
Wind power in New Zealand

References

Buildings and structures in Manawatū-Whanganui
Wind farms in New Zealand
Tararua Range